The New York Film Critics Online Award for Best Actress is an award given annually by the New York Film Critics Online. It was first introduced in 2001 to reward the best performance by a leading actor.

Winners

2000s

2010s

Multiple winners
2 wins
 Meryl Streep (2009, 2011)

See also
 Los Angeles Film Critics Association Award for Best Actress
 National Board of Review Award for Best Actress
 New York Film Critics Circle Award for Best Actress
 National Society of Film Critics Award for Best Actress

External links
 www.nyfco.net

References

A
Film awards for lead actor
Awards established in 2001